Coyote is the fifth album by Matt Mays, released on September 4,2012. It debuted at #7 on the Canadian Albums Chart. It won the 2014 Juno Award for Rock Album of the Year.

Track listing

All songs written by Matt Mays, except as noted.

References

External links
 Official Matt Mays website

2012 albums
Matt Mays albums
Juno Award for Rock Album of the Year albums